The members of the 11th General Assembly of Newfoundland were elected in the Newfoundland general election held in November 1873. The general assembly sat from February 1874 to Fall 1874.

The Anti-Confederation Party led by Charles Fox Bennett won the election. However, defections and resignations before the assembly's opening reduced his party to a minority and Frederick Carter formed the government in 1874.

Prescott Emerson was chosen as speaker.

Sir Stephen John Hill served as colonial governor of Newfoundland.

Members of the Assembly 
The following members were elected to the assembly in 1873:

Notes:

By-elections 
By-elections were held to replace members for various reasons:

Notes:

References 

Newfoundland
Terms of the General Assembly of Newfoundland and Labrador